Roderick Maurice Perry (July 30, 1934 – December 17, 2020) was an American actor best known for his role as Sgt. David "Deacon" Kay in the 1970s TV series S.W.A.T.  Perry also played leading roles in two blaxploitation movies in the mid-1970s: The Black Godfather (1974) and The Black Gestapo (1975). Other TV appearances include Barney Miller, Good Times, Babylon 5, and the 1974 TV movies The Autobiography of Miss Jane Pittman and Trapped Beneath the Sea.
In the 2000s, Perry had a cameo role in the 2003 film version of S.W.A.T., playing the father of the character he portrayed three decades earlier in the TV series, played on this occasion by LL Cool J.

Background
He is the father of singer DeQn Sue who released her Zeitgeist album in 2014.

Career
Perry's earliest film work was in the Lamberto V. Avellana directed Indian / Philippine film,  The Evil Within, released in 1970. He played the part of Rod Stevens who teamed up with special agent Dev Varma (played by Dev Anand) to bust up an opium syndicate.<ref>'"Scroll.in, Tuesday, February 20th 2018 - FILM HISTORY, From Dev Anand’s back catalogue, the Indo-Filipino movie about an evil princess and opium smuggling</ref> Following that he played the part of cowboy Joe Pittman  in the  made for television film, The Autobiography of Miss Jane Pittman. His character Joe Pittman marries Miss Jane Pittman (Played by Cicely Tyson). After he is killed from being dragged by a horse. After that he had the lead role in Street Wars aka The Black Godfather, which also starred Don Chastain and Jimmy Witherspoon.Blaxploitation Films, By Mikel J Koven - The Black Godfather (1974)

Perry was cast as Sgt. David "Deacon" Kay in the TV series S.W.A.T which came out in 1975, and ran until 1976. The role of "Deacon" was to take care of the field communication. Perry played the lead role of Gen. Ahmed  in the 1975 exploitation flick, The Black Gestapo.

In 2005, he appeared in Halloween House Party'' which also starred Joe Torry, Rachel Owens and Buddy Lewis.

Filmography

References

External links

1934 births
2020 deaths
20th-century American male actors
21st-century American male actors
African-American male actors
American male film actors
American male television actors
Male actors from Pennsylvania
People from Coatesville, Pennsylvania
Burials at Riverside National Cemetery
20th-century African-American people
21st-century African-American people